Mount Carmel is a town in Springfield Township, Franklin County, Indiana, United States. The population was 86 at the 2010 census.

History
Mount Carmel was founded in 1837. The town took its name from the Mt. Carmel Presbyterian Church.

A post office was established at Mount Carmel in 1840, and remained in operation until it was discontinued in 1906.

Geography

Demographics

2010 census
As of the census of 2010, there were 86 people, 31 households, and 25 families living in the town. The racial makeup of the town was 97.7% White and 2.3% from two or more races.

There were 31 households, of which 45.2% had children under the age of 18 living with them, 54.8% were married couples living together, 22.6% had a female householder with no husband present, 3.2% had a male householder with no wife present, and 19.4% were non-families. 16.1% of all households were made up of individuals, and 6.4% had someone living alone who was 65 years of age or older. The average household size was 2.77 and the average family size was 2.96.

The median age in the town was 35 years. 31.4% of residents were under the age of 18; 11.7% were between the ages of 18 and 24; 23.3% were from 25 to 44; 22.1% were from 45 to 64; and 11.6% were 65 years of age or older. The gender makeup of the town was 45.3% male and 54.7% female.

2000 census
As of the census of 2000, there were 106 people, 39 households, and 23 families living in the town. The racial makeup of the town was 99.06% White and 0.94% African American.

There were 39 households, out of which 33.3% had children under the age of 18 living with them, 48.7% were married couples living together, 10.3% had a female householder with no husband present, and 38.5% were non-families. 30.8% of all households were made up of individuals, and 15.4% had someone living alone who was 65 years of age or older. The average household size was 2.72 and the average family size was 3.42.

In the town, the population was spread out, with 28.3% under the age of 18, 18.9% from 18 to 24, 22.6% from 25 to 44, 17.9% from 45 to 64, and 12.3% who were 65 years of age or older. The median age was 28 years. For every 100 females, there were 82.8 males. For every 100 females age 18 and over, there were 90.0 males.

The median income for a household in the town was $25,000, and the median income for a family was $31,250. Males had a median income of $23,125 versus $17,250 for females. The per capita income for the town was $9,586. There were 28.1% of families and 27.0% of the population living below the poverty line, including 25.0% of under eighteens and 21.4% of those over 64.

Notable people
Mary Louisa Chitwood (1832-1855), writer

References

Towns in Franklin County, Indiana
Towns in Indiana